The Bamaga and Telegraph Roads link the Peninsula Developmental Road (PDR), at a junction  north of Coen, with Airport Road in Bamaga, Queensland to the North. The southern part of the road, between PDR junction and Bramwell Junction, is named Telegraph Road. The northern part of the road between Bramwell Junction and Bamaga is named Bamaga Road. The Bamaga and Telegraph Roads are also referred to as the Northern Peninsula Road.

List of towns, localities and points of interest along the highway
 Moreton Telegraph Station
 Bramwell Junction
 Jardine River (Jardine River Ferry)
 Injinoo

Major intersections
This road has no major intersections.

Gallery

See also

 List of highways in Queensland

References

Roads in Queensland
Far North Queensland